Falsorsidis griseofasciatus is a species of beetle in the family Cerambycidae, and the only species in the genus Falsorsidis. It was described by Pic in 1959.

References

Desmiphorini
Beetles described in 1959
Monotypic Cerambycidae genera